Gauntlet IV is a 1993 action video game developed by M2 and published by Tengen for the Sega Genesis. It is a port of the original Gauntlet, and was well received by critics.

Gameplay 

Gauntlet IV main mode is "quest mode", which combines the gameplay of the original game with a character-leveling system and item purchasing. Additionally, it includes "arcade mode", a port of the original game, "battle mode", a deathmatch game, and "record mode", a single-player only variant of arcade mode in which progress is kept track via a password.

Development and release 

Gauntlet IV began as a port of the original Gauntlet for the Sharp X68000 produced as a homebrew project by a group of friends in Japan who would later form the development studio M2. It was picked up by Atari Games, the makers of the original game, and used instead as the basis for a sequel for the Genesis published by Tengen, their home-publishing imprint. The game's soundtrack was composed by Hitoshi Sakimoto and Masaharu Iwata.

Reception

Upon the game's release in 1993, MegaTech said that "the action is flawless" and had stood the test of time well. They continued that it was "a brilliant game, and one that warrants immediate attention". Mega praised the longevity of the game, saying it was "huge fun and a must-buy" and placing the game at No. 19 in their list of the best Mega Drive games of all time.

References 

1993 video games
Dungeon crawler video games
Fantasy video games
Hack and slash games
Sega Genesis games
Sega Genesis-only games
Video game sequels
Video games about valkyries
Video games developed in Japan
Video games scored by Masaharu Iwata
Video games scored by Hitoshi Sakimoto